Lake Fenton is a lake in Fenton Charter Township, Genesee County in the U.S. state of Michigan.

The census-designated place Lake Fenton is named for the lake, which was also known as Long Lake.

See also
List of lakes in Michigan

References

Fenton
Bodies of water of Genesee County, Michigan